Ngadirojo is one of the districts in Wonogiri Regency, Central Java, Indonesia. Ngadirojo located in the eastern District of Wonogiri. It is adjacent to Karanganyar. This district consists of eleven villages, i.e. 
1. Gemawang 
2. Kerjo Kidul 
3. Gedong 
4. Pondok 
5. Kerjo Lor 
6. Ngadirojo Kidul
7. Ngadirojo Lor 
8. Mlokomanis Wetan 
9. Mlokomanis Kulon 
10. Kasihan 
11. Jatimarto

References 

Districts of Central Java